Sergo Vares (born on 14 September 1982 in Rakvere) is an Estonian actor.

Vares graduated from Rakvere Gymnasium in 2001. In 2002, he enrolled at the University of Tartu to study journalism, but left to study acting at the Estonian Academy of Music and Theatre under course instructor Priit Pedajas, graduating in 2006. From 2006 until 2012, he worked at the NO99 Theatre. Besides theatre roles he has played also in several films and television series.

Filmography

 2006: Leiutajateküla Lotte (animated film; voice)
 2008: Detsembrikuumus 
 2009: Kättemaksukontor
 2011: Idioot 
 2012: Päikese poole 	
 2017: Mehetapja/Süütu/Vari 
 2018: Pank 
 2020: Tenet

References

Living people
1982 births
Estonian male stage actors
Estonian male film actors
Estonian male television actors
Estonian male voice actors
21st-century Estonian male actors
Estonian Academy of Music and Theatre alumni
People from Rakvere